Amphorina linensis is a species of sea slug or nudibranch, a marine gastropod mollusc in the family Eubranchidae. Several species of Eubranchus were transferred to Amphorina in 2020.

Distribution
This species was described from Tarifa, Spain. It has been reported from the Netherlands and Portugal.

References

Eubranchidae
Gastropods described in 1990